Godfrey Leonard Norrman,  (1846 – November 16, 1909) was an important architect in the southeastern United States. A number of his commissions are now listed on the National Register of Historic Places, and in 1897 he was made a Fellow of the American Institute of Architects.

Biography
A native of Sweden, he arrived in Atlanta, Georgia, around 1880 and designed buildings for the International Cotton Exposition (1881). He also designed the Armstrong Hotel of Rome, the Windsor Hotel of Americus, the Gate City Bank and Hebrew Orphan Asylum, Edward Peters Atlanta mansion (1883), Anderson Hall at Savannah College of Art and Design (1896) and the Piedmont Exposition Building of Atlanta, and also homes in Inman Park Atlanta. His firm was called "Norrman and Humphreys" with George Phares Humphreys who designed Joel Chandler Harris's home, Wren's Nest. He maintained offices in Joel Hurt's Equitable Building, resided in the Kimball House and remained in the city until his death.  He also designed the Bishop William Wallace Duncan House at Spartanburg, South Carolina.

A number of his works are listed on the U.S. National Register of Historic Places (NRHP). He was a member of American Institute of Architects (1885-1888 and 1897 to his death) and in 1897 they made him a Fellow of the organization.

Norrman suffered from ill health near the end of his life, and committed suicide on November 16, 1909. He is buried in Oakland Cemetery in Atlanta.

Works
Works include (with attribution):

Edward C. Peters House (1883), 179 Ponce de Leon Ave. Atlanta, GA (Norrman,Gottfrid L.), NRHP-listed 
Anderson Hall at Savannah College of Art and Design (1896)
Armstrong Hotel, Rome, Georgia
Windsor Hotel of Americus, 
the Gate City Bank and Hebrew Orphan Asylum,  
the Piedmont Exposition Building of Atlanta
Bishop William Wallace Duncan House at Spartanburg, South Carolina.
Sixteenth Street School, 1532 3rd Ave. Columbus, GA (Norrman,G.L.), NRHP-listed
Springwood Cemetery, Main St. and Elford St. Greenville, SC (Norrman, Gottfried L.), NRHP-listed 
Maxwell House, at 134 McDonald Street, Marietta, Georgia, in the NRHP-listed Whitlock Avenue Historic District (Norrman,Gottfried L.), NRHP-listed
One or more works in Atlanta University Center District, roughly bounded by transit right-of-way, Northside Dr., Walnut, Fair, Roach, W. End Dr., Euralee and Chestnut Sts. Atlanta, GA (Norrman,Gottfried L.), NRHP-listed 
House for Lawrence McNeil, Savannah (1903) Paul Romare Residence, 17 East North Avenue, Atlanta, Georgia, built around 1892 or 1893. The Bank of America Building now stands on this property.  Thacker Howard Bell Residence, 665 Peachtree Street, Atlanta, Georgia, built around 1892 or 1893. Location: NE corner of Peachtree & Fifth Street

References

External links
Edward C. Peters House (The Mansion Restaurant) at www.bluffton.edu
https://apps.atlantaga.gov/citydir/URBAN/petersh.htm

History of Atlanta
1846 births
1909 deaths
19th-century American architects
American people of Swedish descent
Fellows of the American Institute of Architects
Suicides by firearm in Georgia (U.S. state)
1909 suicides
20th-century American architects